is a Japanese publisher of dictionaries, literature, comics (manga), non-fiction, DVDs, and other media in Japan.

Shogakukan founded Shueisha, which also founded Hakusensha. These are three separate companies, but are together called the Hitotsubashi Group, one of the largest publishing groups in Japan. Shogakukan is headquartered in the Shogakukan Building in Hitotsubashi, part of Kanda, Chiyoda, Tokyo, near the Jimbocho book district. The corporation also has the other two companies located in the same ward.

International operations

In the United States
Shogakukan, along with Shueisha, owns Viz Media, which publishes manga from both companies in the United States.

Shogakukan's licensing arm in North America was ShoPro Entertainment; it was merged into Viz Media in 2005.

Shogakukan's production arm is Shogakukan-Shueisha Productions (previously Shogakukan Productions Co., Ltd.)

In March 2010 it was announced that Shogakukan would partner with the American comics publisher Fantagraphics to issue a line of manga to be edited by Rachel Thorn.

In Europe
In Europe, manga from Shōgakukan and Shūeisha  are published by local publishers such like Pika Édition, Ki-oon, Kana and Kazé for the French market, and Kazé, Carlsen, Egmont and Tokyopop for the German market. Shogakukan, Shueisha  and ShoPro have made a joint venture named Viz Media Europe. Viz Media Europe bought in 2009 the French Kazé Group whose activities are mainly publishing manga and home video for the French and German market.

In Southeast Asia
The company has a wholly owned subsidiary, Shogakukan Asia, headquartered in Singapore. Besides producing popular titles in English such as Detective Conan, Pokémon and Future Card Buddyfight, the company also partners with local creators such as Johnny Lau to publish comic series for distribution in Southeast Asia.

New Manga Awards
Shogakukan has awards for amateur manga artists who want to become professional. It allows people to either send in their manga by mail or bring it in to an editor.

Genghis Khan controversy
On February 15, 2018, CoroCoro Comic (aka "Gekkan Corocoro Comic"), a children's magazine published by Shogakukan published its March issue with a cartoon making fun of Genghis Khan, the founder of the Mongol Empire. The comic depicted a mischievous boy drawing juvenile things on pictures of famous people, such as a dog's face on a picture of Albert Einstein. Genghis Khan was depicted  with a crude rendering of male genitalia on his forehead. Initially after some backlash, Shogakukan offered an apology addressed to the Mongolian Embassy in Tokyo on February 23, but it failed to mollify reactions by the Mongolians in Japan who regard Genghis Khan a national hero.

On February 26, Mongolians and citizens from China's Inner Mongolia Autonomous Region residing in Japan sent a formal letter of protest to Shogakukan and a group of approximately 90 demonstrators protested in front of Shogakukan Inc.'s headquarters. Major bookselling chains, Kinokuniya, Miraiya and Kumazawa pulled the publication off its shelves after the Mongolian Embassy of Tokyo filed an official complaint with the Japanese Foreign Ministry. In March 2018, Shogakukan issued a further public apology, announced a national recall of the magazine and offered reimbursement to magazine goers. CoroCoro Comic's website also published an apology by Asumi Yoshino, author of the serialized manga, Yarisugi!!! Itazura-kun, which contained the controversial cartoon drawing.

List of magazines published

Manga magazines

Male oriented manga magazines
Children's manga magazines
CoroCoro Comic (Since 1977)
Bessatsu CoroCoro Comic (Since 1981)
CoroCoro Ichiban! (Since 2005)

Shōnen manga magazines
Weekly Shōnen Sunday (Since 1959)
Shōnen Sunday Super (Since 1978)
Shōnen Big Comic (1979–1987) (discontinued)
Monthly Shōnen Sunday (Since 2009)
 (1960–1974)

Seinen manga magazines
Big Comic (Since 1968)
Big Comic Business
Big Comic Original (Since 1972)
Big Comic Spirits (Since 1980)
Monthly Big Comic Spirits (Since 2009)
Big Comic Special
Big Comic Superior (Since 1987)
IKKI (2003-2014) (discontinued)
Monthly Sunday Gene-X (Since 2000)
Weekly Young Sunday (1987–2008) (discontinued)

Female oriented manga magazines
Woman's weekly magazine (since 1805)
Children's manga magazines
Pucchigumi (ぷっちぐみ) (since 2006)

Shōjo manga magazines
Betsucomi (Since 1970)
Cheese! (Since 1996)
ChuChu (2000–2010, now discontinued)
Ciao (Since 1977)
Pochette
Shōjo Comic (Since 1968), called Sho-Comi since December 2007

Josei manga magazines
flowers (Since 2002)
Judy
Petit Comic (Since 1977)
Rinka (2007–discontinued)

Fashion magazines
CanCam (Since 1982)

Anime
Shogakukan produces (or makes part of the production of) anime based on their mangas, mostly through their subsidiary Shogakukan-Shueisha Productions.

Imprints

Tentomushi Comics
, abbreviated TC, is the 
imprint used for tankōbon editions of manga series serialized in Monthly CoroCoro Comic and 
Bessatsu CoroCoro Comic magazines.

See also

 Gagaga Bunko, one of the Light Novel Imprints by Shogakukan
 Jinbōchō Theater, owned and operated by Shogakukan
 List of manga published by Shogakukan
 List of works published by Shogakukan

References

External links

 Shogakukan website
 Shogakukan website 
 Shogakukan Asia website 
 
 

 
Hitotsubashi Group
Comic book publishing companies in Tokyo
Book publishing companies in Tokyo
Magazine publishing companies in Tokyo
Software companies based in Tokyo
Publishing companies established in 1922
Publishers of adult comics
Disney comics publishers
Mass media companies based in Tokyo
Japanese companies established in 1922
Anime companies
Manga distributors